Maxine may refer to:

People
Maxine is a feminine given name.
 Maxine Andrews (1916–1995), member of The Andrews Sisters singing trio
 Maxine Audley (1923–1992), English actress
 Maxine Brown (country singer) (1932-2019), American country music singer
 Maxine Brown (soul singer) (born 1939), American soul and R&B singer
 Maxine D. Brown, American computer scientist
 Maxine Carr, convicted of perverting the course of justice in relation to the Soham murders (not to be confused with Maxine Moore Carr / Maxine Waters below)
 Maxine Dexter (1972), American politician
 Maxine Elliott (1868–1940), American actress
 Maxine Fassberg (born 1953), CEO, Intel Israel
 Maxine Hong Kingston (born 1940), Chinese American author and Professor Emerita
 Maxine Kumin (1925–2014), American poet and author
 Maxine Mawhinney (born 1957), newsreader on the BBC News 24-hour television channel
 Maxine McKew (born 1953), Australian politician and journalist
 Maxine Medina (born 1990), Filipino model, beauty pageant titleholder, Miss Universe Philippines 2016, and top 6 Miss Universe 2016
 Maxine Nightingale (born 1952), British R&B and soul music singer
 Maxine Peake (born 1974), English actress
 Maxine Reiner (1916–2003), American actress
 Maxine Sanders (born 1946), British Wiccan
 Maxine Sullivan (born Marietta Williams, 1911–1987), American jazz vocalist/performer
 Maxine Waters (born Maxine Moore Carr, born 1938), American politician
 Maxine (wrestler) (born 1986), stage name of American former professional wrestler, model, and former WWE Diva Karlee Pérez

Fictional characters
 Maxine Peacock, from the British soap opera, Coronation Street
 Maxine Chadway, from the television series Soul Food
 Maxine Conway, from the Australian drama series, Wentworth
 Maxine Minniver, from the British soap opera, Hollyoaks
 Maxine Barlow, from the British drama series Waterloo Road
 Maxine Mayfield, "Max" or "Madmax", on the Netflix series Stranger Things
 Max Caulfield, or Maxine, main character in the video game Life Is Strange
 Maxine Shaw, from the American television sitcom Living Single
 Maxine, a character in a line of Hallmark Cards
 Maxine Guevara, main character of the American TV series Dark Angel
 Maxine Baker, daughter of Animal Man (Buddy Baker) in DC Comics
 Maxine Tarnow, main character in Thomas Pynchon's novel Bleeding Edge

Other uses
 Maxine, West Virginia, an unincorporated community
 3977 Maxine, an asteroid, see List of minor planets: 3001–4000
 Maxine Virtual Machine, an open source Java virtual machine

Music
 "Maxine" (Sharon O'Neill song), a song from Sharon O'Neill
 "Maxine", a 2007 reissue bonus track on the album Traveling Wilburys Vol. 1
 "Maxine", a song by John Legend from the album Once Again
 "Maxine", a song by Donald Fagen from the album The Nightfly
 "Maxine", a 1996 rap song by Eminem from the album Infinite

See also
 Max (disambiguation)
 Maximilian
 Maximus (disambiguation)

English feminine given names
Feminine given names